William Fleeson is an American personality psychologist. He is the Hultquist Family Professor of Psychology at Wake Forest University. He earned his Ph.D. in psychology from the University of Michigan after completing a Bachelor of Arts in philosophy at the University of Wisconsin–Madison. He was president of Association for Research in Personality (ARP) in 2012. He was awarded the Society for Personality and Social Psychology (SPSP) Theoretical Innovation Prize in 2002 and the SPSP Carol and Ed Diener Award in Personality Psychology in 2016.

References 

Living people
21st-century American psychologists
University of Wisconsin–Madison alumni
Year of birth missing (living people)
University of Michigan alumni
Wake Forest University faculty
Personality psychologists